Zaur Enverovich Mamutov (born 22 January 1980) is a former Ukrainian-Russian football player.

External links
 

1980 births
Living people
Ukrainian footballers
Ukrainian footballers banned from domestic competitions
Russian footballers
PFC CSKA Moscow players
Russian Premier League players
FC Kuban Krasnodar players
FC Desna Chernihiv players
Association football defenders
FC Krymteplytsia Molodizhne players
FC Spartak Molodizhne players
FC Hvardiyets Hvardiiske players
FC Spartak Kostroma players